My Talking Tom is a virtual pet app released by Slovenian studio Outfit7 in November 11, 2013. It is similar to Pou and the fourteenth app of the Talking Tom & Friends series overall. It was the first Outfit7 game to feature the smoother animation, and to feature Talking Tom's current design. A similar app called My Talking Angela was released on December 3, 2014, with its sequel released on July 13, 2021. Another similar app called My Talking Hank was released on December 2, 2016. A sequel, My Talking Tom 2, was released on November 3, 2018. Yet another similar app called My Talking Tom Friends was released on June 11, 2020.
It was the first app to be released under the franchise's new name.

Gameplay
The goal of the game is to take care of an anthropomorphic grey tabby cat named Tom (who can optionally be renamed by the player). The player is invited to care for Tom and help him grow from a baby kitten to a full-grown tomcat by interacting with him in different ways, such as feeding him, taking him to the bathroom, playing mini games, and tucking him into his bed to sleep when he is tired. Tom can repeat words spoken into the device's microphone for up to 25 seconds using a synthesized voice. Through in-app purchases, in-game currency, or by logging into Facebook, there is an option to visit Tom's friends, or travel around the world. Using in-game currency, various different outfits, skins, and accessories can be purchased to dress-up and customize Tom.

Age Inappropriate Advertising Controversy 
The app was reported for having advertised age-inappropriate advertisements for adult services. In 2015, the UK Advertising Standards Authority (ASA) ruled that advertising for an adult website was delivered to underage children via the app. The ASA noted that Outfit7 "had a strict advertising policy" but that the company "had not been able to identify which ad network had served an age-inappropriate ad on a children’s app" and how the advertisements were shown in the app.

Awards
 "Best iPad Game: Kids, Education & Family" at the 2014 Tabby Awards.
 "Best iPad Game: Kids, Education & Family" and "Best Android Game: Puzzle, Cards & Family".

See also
 Talking Tom & Friends
 Talking Angela

References

External links
 

2013 video games
Android (operating system) games
IOS games
Outfit7 games
Virtual pet video games
Video games about cats
Video games developed in Slovenia
Windows Phone games
Anthropomorphic cats
Talking Tom & Friends